Kisnána is a village in Heves county, Hungary, located  from Gyöngyös to the northeast.
There is a castle in the village that was built in the 11th or 12th century.

Sightseeing for visitors
The village has an interesting assembly of buildings worth visiting. There is the old castle and the old Árpád age church inside the castle.

Castle

In the Árpád age the region was in the possession of the Aba Genus, who was related to the king of Hungary. The leader of the Genus, Aba Sámuel married the sister of king Saint Stephen. In 1044 Aba Sámuel became King of Hungary. Later descendants of the Genus were smaller families and one of them, the Kompolti family became the landowner of Kisnána. Kompolti János built the first part of the castle, as mentioned in the charters from 1445 about the „castrum” (fortress). In 1521 the landowner of the castle was István Losonczy who defended Temesvár against the Türks. The last owner was László Móré, who alternately supported the two kings of the early Turkish times: János Szapolyai or Habsburg Ferdinánd. But the Turks defeated him and László Móré died in the prison of Seven Towers in Istanbul, capital of the Osman Turk Empire.

Church

In the old castle of the Kompolti family there is another, even older architectural heritage building from the early Árpád ages. It is a gothic church, originally built in the romanesque style. The excavations of the ruins of this church revealed the foundations of an ancient rotunda. Originally this rotunda had been built first on the hill and later it was gradually extended. When the Kompolti family surrounded it by walls, they developed it as the castle-church and rebuilt it finally in the gothic style in the 14th century.

Sources
 Gerő, L. (1984): Magyar műemléki ABC. (Hungarian Architectural Heritage ABC.) Budapest
 Gervers-Molnár, V. (1972): A középkori Magyarország rotundái. (Rotunda in the Medieval Hungary). Akadémiai, Budapest
 Henszlmann, I. (1876): Magyarország ó-keresztyén, román és átmeneti stylü mű-emlékeinek rövid ismertetése, (Old-Christian, Romanesque and Transitional Style Architecture in Hungary). Királyi Magyar Egyetemi Nyomda, Budapest

References

Populated places in Heves County
Romanesque architecture in Hungary